Artistic gymnastics at the 2019 European Youth Summer Olympic Festival are held at the National Gymnastics Arena in Baku, Azerbaijan, from 23 to 27 July 2019.

Medals summary

Medalists

Medal standings

Overall

Men

Women

Men's results

Team

Individual all-around

Floor

Pommel horse

Rings

Vault

Parallel bars

Horizontal bar

Women's results

Team

Individual all-around

Vault

Uneven bars

Balance beam

Floor

Qualification

Men's results

Individual all-around

Floor

Pommel horse

Rings

Vault

Parallel bars

Horizontal bar

Women's results

Individual all-around

Vault

Uneven bars

Balance beam

Floor

References

External links

European Youth Summer Olympic Festival
2019 European Youth Summer Olympic Festival
2019
International gymnastics competitions hosted by Azerbaijan